{{DISPLAYTITLE:C5H9ClO}}
The molecular formula C5H9ClO (molar mass: 120.58 g/mol) may refer to:

 Pentanoyl chloride, an acyl chloride derived from pentanoic acid
 Pivaloyl chloride, a branched-chain acyl chloride

Acyl chlorides